The enzyme wax-ester hydrolase (EC 3.1.1.50) catalyzes the reaction

a wax ester + H2O  a long-chain alcohol + a long-chain carboxylate

Thus, the two substrates of this enzyme are wax ester and H2O, whereas its two products are long-chain alcohol and long-chain carboxylate.

This enzyme belongs to the family of hydrolases, specifically those acting on carboxylic ester bonds.  The systematic name of this enzyme class is wax-ester acylhydrolase. Other names in common use include jojoba wax esterase, and WEH.

References

 
 

EC 3.1.1
Enzymes of unknown structure